10 Songs is the second LP by American emo band I Hate Myself, released in the year 1997. It is the most well known album by the band, and it uses the "Black Casper" font. It was re-released on CD with "To a Husband at War" as a bonus track in 2000. The song originally appeared on the band's split 7-inch with Strikeforce Diablo.

Track listing 
 "This Isn't the Tenka-Ichi-Budôkai" – 3:33
 "Urban Barbie" – 1:56
 "Polar Bear Summer" – 4:06
 "...And Keep Reaching for Those Stars" – 3:11
 "Caught in a Flood with the Captain of the Cheerleading Squad " – 3:26
 "Kind of a Long Way Down" – 1:51
 "Not Waving But Drowning" – 3:49
 "Destroy All Monsters" – 3:27
 "To a Husband at War" – 3:12
 "Conversation with Dr. Seussicide" – 6:19
 "Secret Lovers at the Heaven's Gate Ranch" – 1:35

Personnel 
Jim Marburger – vocals, guitar
Jon Marburger – drums
Steve Jin – bass
Mike Taylor – cover artwork
Steve Heritage – mastering
Rob McGergor – recording

References

1997 albums
I Hate Myself (band) albums
No Idea Records albums
Albums produced by Rob McGregor